Sei gegrüßet, Jesu gütig, BWV 768, also known as Partite diverse sopra "Sei gegrüßet, Jesu gütig", is a chorale partita for organ by Johann Sebastian Bach.

History 
The work consists of a chorale and eleven short variations written on it. This is one of Bach's earlier works, dating from around 1705, when the young composer was influenced by the style of the variations of Georg Böhm, organist of St. John's Church in Lüneburg, where Bach was a student. Dieterich Buxtehude is another probable source of inspiration. Of Bach's chorale partitas for organ, this is the longest.

Bach composed the initial chorale by taking the old traditional melody of "Sei gegrüßet, Jesu gütig", then presented a series of variations according to different styles. Five of the eleven variations require an organ with pedals. The melody of the original hymn is usually present in the soprano part. Each variation is developed based on a rhythmic motif or theme.

Greater descriptions of the widely varying styles of these variations are written by Stainton de B Taylor and by Philipp Spitta  who note not only the Bohm-like styles but also a few variations being clearly from the much more mature Bach.

Structure 
 Chorale
 Variation I (a 2 Clav.)
 Variation II
 Variation III
 Variation IV
 Variation V
 Variation VI
 Variation VII (a 2 Clav. e Ped.)
 Variation VIII
 Variation IX (a 2 Clav. e Ped.)
 Variation X (a 2 Clav. e Ped.)
 Variation XI (a 5 voci, in Organo pleno)

A complete performance lasts about twenty minutes.

External links
 
 Work  at Bach Digital website

Compositions by Johann Sebastian Bach
Compositions for organ
Compositions in G minor